The Music Box was a 1957 television variety show by Associated-Rediffusion, produced by Jack Hylton. The half-hour (30 minutes with ads, approx 25 minutes without ads) series featured a variety of singers, novelty acts, dancers and musicians. Unlike most programming by Associated-Rediffusion, the series survives in its entirety. It has yet to appear on home video.

References

External links
 

British variety television shows
1957 British television series debuts
1957 British television series endings
1950s British music television series
Black-and-white British television shows
Television shows produced by Associated-Rediffusion
English-language television shows